"BabyWipe" is a song by American rapper Ski Mask the Slump God, released through SoundCloud on April 22, 2017. It was released to streaming services on April 28, 2017, as the lead single from his second mixtape You Will Regret (2017). The song was produced by CashMoneyAP.

Music video
A music video was directed by Cole Bennett was released on September 11, 2017. Featuring psychedelic animation, it finds Ski Mask in strange scenarios that "blend 90's late night television aesthetic and sci-fi all together". They include him appearing as an astral projection, playfully rocking his head back and forth, and his face becoming distorted. In one clip, he is also in pajamas in bed while smoking.

Certifications

References

2017 singles
2017 songs
Ski Mask the Slump God songs
Songs written by CashMoneyAP
Music videos directed by Cole Bennett
Republic Records singles